Michel Pietracupa (born 12 July 1959) is a Canadian weightlifter. He competed in the men's middleweight event at the 1984 Summer Olympics.

References

1959 births
Living people
Canadian male weightlifters
Olympic weightlifters of Canada
Weightlifters at the 1984 Summer Olympics
People from Baie-Comeau
Sportspeople from Quebec
20th-century Canadian people
21st-century Canadian people